In ancient Egyptian history, dynasties are series of rulers sharing a common origin. They are usually, but not always, traditionally divided into 33 pharaonic dynasties; these dynasties are commonly grouped by modern scholars into "kingdoms" and "intermediate periods".

The first 30 divisions come from the 3rd century BC Egyptian priest Manetho, whose Aegyptaiaca, was probably written for a Greek-speaking Ptolemaic ruler of Egypt but survives only in fragments and summaries. The names of the last two, the short-lived 31st Dynasty and the longer-lasting Ptolemaic Dynasty, are later coinings.

While widely used and useful, the system does have its shortcomings. Some dynasties only ruled part of Egypt and existed concurrently with other dynasties based in other cities. The 7th might not have existed at all, the 10th seems to be a continuation of the 9th, and there might have been one or several Upper Egyptian Dynasties before what is termed the 1st Dynasty.

List of dynasties in ancient Egyptian history

See also

List of pharaohs
Egyptian chronology
Muhammad Ali dynasty

Notes

References

Works cited
 

 
Dynasties, List of Egyptian
Egypt, Ancient